The Borôroan languages of Brazil are Borôro and the extinct Umotína and Otuke. They are sometimes considered to form part of the proposed Macro-Jê language family, though this has been disputed.

They are called the Borotuke languages by Mason (1950), a portmanteau of Bororo and Otuke.

Languages
The relationship between the languages is,
Umotina (†)
Otuke–Bororo
Borôro
? Bororo of Cabaçal (†)
Otuke (†), Gorgotoqui (†) ?

Gorgotoqui may have also been a Bororoan language.

See Otuke for various additional varieties of the Chiquito Plains in Bolivia which may have been dialects of it, such as Kovare and Kurumina.

There are other recorded groups that may have spoken languages or dialects closer to Borôro, such as Aravirá, but nothing is directly known about these languages:
Aravirá – extinct language once spoken on the Cabaçal River and Sepotuba River in Mato Grosso according to Loukotka (1968)

Orari (Eastern Borôro, Orarimugodoge), listed by Loukotka as a language that was spoken on the Valhas River, Garças River, and Madeira River in Mato Grosso, is another name for Bororo.

Bororo of Cabaçal, which has been documented by Johann Natterer and Francis de Castelnau, has been identified by Camargo (2014) as a separate language distinct from Bororo proper.

Vocabulary
Loukotka (1968) lists the following basic vocabulary items.

{| class="wikitable sortable"
! gloss !! Boróro !! Orari !! Umutina !! Otuque
|-
! tongue
| i-táuro || i-kaura || azoː || ki-taho
|-
! hand
| i-kéra || i-kera || azyida || seni
|-
! fire
| yóru || dzyóru || zoːruː || reru
|-
! stone
| tori || tori || tauri || tohori
|-
! sun
| kueri || meri || baru || neri
|-
! moon
| ári || ari || aːliː || ari
|-
! earth
| róto || mottu || moto || moktuhu
|-
! jaguar
| adúgo || adugo || azyukuetá || anteko
|-
! fish
| kare || karo || haré || aharo
|-
! house
| bái || bai || isipá || huala
|-
! bow
| baíga || voiga || bóika || vevika
|}

Proto-language

External relations
The Bororoan languages are commonly thought to be part of the Macro-Jê language family.

Ceria & Sandalo (1995) note parallels between Bororo and the Guaicuruan languages. Kaufman (1994) has suggested a relationship with the Chiquitano language, which Nikulin (2020) considers to be a sister of Macro-Jê. Furthermore, Nikulin (2019) has suggested that Bororoan has a relationship with the Cariban and Kariri languages:

{| class="wikitable sortable"
! gloss !! Proto-Bororo !! Kariri !! Proto-Cariban
|-
! tooth
| *ɔ || dza || *(j)ə
|-
! ear
| *bidʒa || beɲe || *pana
|-
! go
| *tu ||  || *tə
|-
! tree
| *i || dzi || *jeje
|-
! tongue
|  || nunu || *nuru
|-
! root
|  || mu || *mi(t-)
|-
! hand
|  || (a)mɨsã || *əmija
|-
! fat (n.)
| *ka ||  || *ka(t-)
|-
! seed
| *a ||  || *a
|-
! fish
| *karo ||  || *kana
|-
! name
| *idʒe || dze || 
|-
! heavy
| *motɨtɨ || madi || 
|}

An automated computational analysis (ASJP 4) by Müller et al. (2013) also found lexical similarities between Bororoan and Cariban.

Language contact
Jolkesky (2016) notes that there are lexical similarities with the Guato, Karib, Kayuvava, Nambikwara, and Tupi language families due to contact.

Cariban influence in Bororoan languages was due to the later southward expansion of Cariban speakers into Bororoan territory. Ceramic technology was also adopted from Cariban speakers. Similarly, Cariban borrowings are also present in the Karajá languages. Karajá speakers had also adopted ceramic technology from Cariban speakers.

Similarities with Cayuvava are due to the expansion of Bororoan speakers into the Chiquitania region.

References

Further reading

 
 
 
 

 
Macro-Jê languages
Language families
Languages of Brazil
Indigenous languages of South America (Central)
Mamoré–Guaporé linguistic area